Shungo Oyama ( 峻護 Ōyama Shungo ; born April 11, 1974) is a Japanese former professional mixed martial artist. A professional competitor from 2001 to 2014, he competed for the PRIDE Fighting Championships, Pancrase, RINGS, DREAM, K-1, and King of the Cage.

Early life
Oyama was born in Nasu District in Tochigi Prefecuture, Japan on April 11, 1974 as Toshiyuki Oyama. He started practicing Judo when he was five years old, winning the All Japan Businessmen's Individual Championship, among other titles. He did not limit itself to a single grappling style, and also won the All Japan Sambo Championship and the All Japan Combat Wrestling Championship. Then, he began training MMA and won All Japan Amateur Shooto Championship, making a pro debut in 2001.

Mixed martial arts career

Background and fighting style
He is best known for being a student of Japanese judo superstar Hidehiko Yoshida, and briefly trained with three-time King of Pancrase Bas Rutten. Shungo has also trained at the famed Takada Dojo, run by former PRIDE General Director Nobuhiko Takada.

Though his record is not impressive, Shungo has gained respect for his die hard spirit, and stubbornness to submit. On more than one occasion he has been injured or choked unconscious due to his refusal to tap out.

PRIDE
Oyama had his anticipated debut in PRIDE Fighting Championships in 2001 against feared Wanderlei Silva. In a fight of 30 seconds, Oyama met a spirited striking exchange, but he was overwhelmed and knocked out while he tried to avoid Silva. Shungo followed with a bout against famed Brazilian jiu-jitsu Wallid Ismail, but he underperformed again. The judoka met Ismail in his field of expertise by pulling guard early with a guillotine choke, which only allowed the Brazilian to pass guard, but Oyama escaped and contained Wallid until the second round. At the end, however, Ismail blocked a triangle choke attempt from Oyama and locked an arm triangle choke which Shungo refused to tap out to, rendering the Japanese unconscious. After the match, it was revealed that Oyama had suffered a retinal detachment.

His third match in PRIDE finally dissipated the negative criticism towards Oyama when he faced Renzo Gracie of the famed Gracie Jiu-Jitsu family. With a combination of his own unorthodox striking style, a good takedown defense and a little Kazushi Sakuraba imitation, Shungo was able to frustrate Gracie and dominate the fight to gain a unanimous decision. In a controversial moment, Gracie, irritated by his fight antics, spit in Shungo’s face. Shortly after, Ryan Gracie challenged him to a fight to avenge Renzo. Oyama and Ryan met in the main event of PRIDE 22-Beasts From The East 2, in a fight in which the BJJ specialist caught Oyama in an armbar. The judoka, in a last action of defiance, refused to submit and got his arm broken. After the fight, Ryan assaulted Oyama and verbally insulted him before being restrained.

Oyama faced Dan Henderson in 2003, going to the fight with an arm injury. After being knocked out by punches, medical examination showed that his eye injury had reopened, and he had to go to hiatus. His last fight in PRIDE was against Mirko Cro Cop, losing again by KO.

Post-PRIDE
In 2006, Oyama faced another Gracie family member in the form of Rodrigo Gracie at the HERO'S 6 event. He got his second victory over the family, controlling Rodrigo and landing ground and pound for a unanimous decision.

Oyama faced Handong Kong at Pancrase 257 on March 30, 2014. He won by first round heel hook.

He participated "Martial Combat 10" as a substitute of Daiju Takase in Singapore for the title of Light Heavyweight(-87 kg) on September 16, 2010. He beat Brian Gassaway from USA with an inverted triangle choke and won the first professional title in his career.

After winning, he proposed to Junko Kawada, with whom he had a four-year relationship while in the cage. They were married in his hometown.

Mixed martial arts record

|-
| Loss
| align=center| 14–19
| Yuji Sakuragi
| TKO (corner stoppage)
| Pancrase 263
| 
| align=center| 2
| align=center| 1:03
| Tokyo, Japan
|
|-
| Loss
| align=center| 14–18
| Ikkei Nagamura
| KO (punch)
| Pancrase 260
| 
| align=center| 2
| align=center| 1:01
| Tokyo, Japan
|
|-
| Win
| align=center| 14–17
| Handong Kong
| Submission (heel hook)
| Pancrase 257
| 
| align=center| 1
| align=center| 3:26
| Yokohama, Kanagawa, Japan
|
|-
| Loss
| align=center| 13–17
| Jordan Currie
| Submission (arm-triangle choke)
| Pancrase 252: 20th Anniversary
| 
| align=center| 1
| align=center| 5:00
| Yokohama, Kanagawa, Japan
|
|-
| Loss
| align=center| 13–16
| Eun Soo Lee
| KO (punches)
| Road FC 10: Monson vs. Kang
| 
| align=center| 1
| align=center| 2:48
| Busan, South Korea
| 
|-
| Loss
| align=center| 13–15
| Asif Tagiecv
| TKO (knees and punches)
| RINGS Vol. 2: Conquisito
| 
| align=center| 1
| align=center| 4:44
| Tokyo, Japan
| 
|-
| Loss
| align=center| 13–14
| Ryo Kawamura
| KO (soccer kick)
| Pancrase: Progress Tour 7
| 
| align=center| 1
| align=center| 4:19
| Tokyo, Japan
| 
|-
| Win
| align=center| 13–13
| Hae Suk Son
| TKO (punches)
| Road FC 6: The Final Four
| 
| align=center| 1
| align=center| 2:10
| Seoul, South Korea
| 
|-
| Win
| align=center| 12–13
| Jong Dae Kim
| Submission (heel hook)
| Road FC 6: The Final Four
| 
| align=center| 1
| align=center| 1:44
| Seoul, South Korea
| 
|-
| Win
| align=center| 11–13
| Denis Kang
| TKO (knees)
| Road FC 5: Night of Champions
| 
| align=center| 1
| align=center| 4:30
| Seoul, South Korea
| 
|-
| Win
| align=center| 10–13
| Kyu Suk Son
| KO (punch)
| Pancrase: Impressive Tour 9
| 
| align=center| 1
| align=center| 0:11
| Tokyo, Japan
| 
|-
| Win
| align=center| 9–13
| Brian Gassaway
| Technical Submission (inverted triangle choke)
| MC: Martial Combat 10
| 
| align=center| 1
| align=center| 1:50
| Sentosa, Singapore
| 
|-
| Loss
| align=center| 8–13
| Vitaly Shemetov
| KO (punches)
| X-1 Nations Collide
| 
| align=center| 1
| align=center| 1:31
| Honolulu, Hawaii
| 
|-
| Win
| align=center| 8–12
| Mike Wimmer
| Submission (heel hook)
| KOTC: Toryumon
| 
| align=center| 1
| align=center| 1:07
| Ginowan, Okinawa, Japan
| 
|-
| Loss
| align=center| 7–12
| Andrews Nakahara
| TKO (punches)
| DREAM.8
| 
| align=center| 1
| align=center| 2:00
| Nagoya, Aichi, Japan
|
|-
| Loss
| align=center| 7–11
| Yoon Dong-Sik
| Decision (unanimous)
| DREAM 2: Middleweight Grand Prix 2008 First Round
| 
| align=center| 2
| align=center| 5:00
| Saitama, Saitama, Japan
| 
|-
| Win
| align=center| 7–10
| Carlos Newton
| Submission (punches)
| HERO'S 2007 in Korea
| 
| align=center| 3
| align=center| 2:42
| Seoul, South Korea
|
|-
| Loss
| align=center| 6–10
| Melvin Manhoef
| TKO (punches)
| HERO'S 7
| 
| align=center| 1
| align=center| 1:04
| Yokohama, Kanagawa, Japan
| 
|-
| Win
| align=center| 6–9
| Rodrigo Gracie
| Decision (unanimous)
| HERO'S 6
| 
| align=center| 2
| align=center| 5:00
| Tokyo, Japan
| 
|-
| Loss
| align=center| 5–9
| Melvin Manhoef
| TKO (doctor stoppage)
| HERO'S 4
| 
| align=center| 1
| align=center| 2:51
| Tokyo, Japan
| 
|-
| Win
| align=center| 5–8
| Peter Aerts
| Submission (heel hook)
| K-1-Premium 2005 Dynamite
| 
| align=center| 1
| align=center| 0:30
| Osaka, Japan
| 
|-
| Win
| align=center| 4–8
| Yun Seob Kwak
| Submission (achilles lock)
| HERO'S 2005 in Seoul
| 
| align=center| 1
| align=center| 1:14
| Seoul, South Korea
|
|-
| Loss
| align=center| 3–8
| Sam Greco
| KO (knees and punches)
| HERO'S 3
| 
| align=center| 1
| align=center| 2:37
| Tokyo, Japan
| 
|-
| Win
| align=center| 3–7
| Valentijn Overeem
| Submission (toe hold)
| HERO'S 1
| 
| align=center| 1
| align=center| 1:28
| Saitama, Saitama, Japan
| 
|-
| Loss
| align=center| 2–7
| Sean O'Haire
| TKO (punches)
| K-1 Fighting Network Rumble on the Rock 2004
| 
| align=center| 1
| align=center| 0:31
| Honolulu, Hawaii, United States
| 
|-
| Loss
| align=center| 2–6
| Mirko Cro Cop
| TKO (punches)
| PRIDE Bushido 4
| 
| align=center| 1
| align=center| 1:00
| Nagoya, Aichi, Japan
| 
|-
| Loss
| align=center| 2–5
| Dan Henderson
| TKO (punches)
| PRIDE 25
| 
| align=center| 1
| align=center| 3:28
| Yokohama, Kanagawa, Japan
|
|-
| Loss
| align=center| 2–4
| Ryan Gracie
| Submission (armbar)
| PRIDE 22
| 
| align=center| 1
| align=center| 1:37
| Nagoya, Aichi, Japan
| 
|-
| Win
| align=center| 2–3
| Renzo Gracie
| Decision (unanimous)
| PRIDE 21
| 
| align=center| 3
| align=center| 5:00
| Saitama, Saitama, Japan
| 
|-
| Loss
| align=center| 1–3
| Wallid Ismail
| Submission (triangle choke)
| PRIDE 15
| 
| align=center| 2
| align=center| 2:30
| Saitama, Saitama, Japan
| 
|-
| Loss
| align=center| 1–2
| Wanderlei Silva
| TKO (punches)
| PRIDE 14: Clash of the Titans
| 
| align=center| 1
| align=center| 0:30
| Yokohama, Kanagawa, Japan
| 
|-
| Loss
| align=center| 1–1
| Phillip Miller
| TKO (strikes)
| KOTC 8: Bombs Away
| 
| align=center| 2
| align=center| 3:00
| Williams, California, United States
| 
|-
| Win
| align=center| 1–0
| Mike Bourke
| KO (punch)
| KOTC 7: Wet and Wild
| 
| align=center| 1
| align=center| 0:17
| San Jacinto, California, United States
|

Championships and accomplishments

Mixed martial arts 
K-1 Hero's
 2006 K-1 Hero's Light Heavyweight Grand Prix Semifinalist
 Martial Combat
 Martial Combat Light Heavyweight Championship (1 Time)
ROAD FC
ROAD FC Middleweight Championship (1 Time, first)
Shooto
 7th All Japan Amateur Shooto Championship, Light heavyweight winner (September 10, 2000)

Judo 
 28th All Japan Business Groups Judo Individual Championship, Men 81 kg class winner

Sambo 
 21st All Japan Sambo Championship, Men Senior 82 kg class runner-up (1997)
 22nd All Japan Sambo Championship, Men Senior 82 kg class winner (1998)
 24th All Japan Sambo Championship, Men Senior 82 kg class winner (June 28, 1998)
 25th All Japan Sambo Championship, Men Senior 82 kg class winner (1999)
 26th All Japan Sambo Championship, Men Senior 82 kg class winner (July 16, 2000)

References

External links 
 

1974 births
Living people
Japanese male mixed martial artists
Middleweight mixed martial artists
Sportspeople from Tochigi Prefecture
Mixed martial artists utilizing judo
Japanese male judoka
Japanese sambo practitioners
Road Fighting Championship champions
Mixed martial artists utilizing sambo
20th-century Japanese people
21st-century Japanese people